Lafour Rural District is a rural district (dehestan) in North Savadkuh County, Mazandaran Province, Iran. At the 2006 census, its population was 4,826, in 1,427 families. The rural district has 29 villages.

References 

Rural Districts of Mazandaran Province
Savadkuh County